Ondřej Stehlík (born April 30, 1990) is a Czech professional ice hockey player. He played with HC Kometa Brno in the Czech Extraliga during the 2010–11 Czech Extraliga playoffs.

References

External links

1990 births
Czech ice hockey forwards
HC Kometa Brno players
Living people
Ice hockey people from Brno
HC Bílí Tygři Liberec players
LHK Jestřábi Prostějov players
HC Oceláři Třinec players
HC Slovan Ústečtí Lvi players
HK Dukla Trenčín players
Hokej Šumperk 2003 players
HC RT Torax Poruba players
HC Berounští Medvědi players
Czech expatriate ice hockey players in Slovakia